Virginia Helen Antoinette Elliott MBE (née Holgate, formerly Leng; born 1 February 1955), sometimes known as Ginny Leng, is a British equestrian competitor who competed in eventing. She is the 1986 World Champion  and three-time Individual European Champion (1985, 1987, 1989). She also won two World team golds (1982 and 1986) and four European team golds (1981, 1985–89). A four-time Olympic medallist, she won Individual bronze and team silver in both 1984 and 1988. From 2008 to 2013, she was the manager of the Irish eventing team.

Major wins
World and European titles:
1985 European champion – Priceless
1986 World champion – Priceless
1987 European champion – Night Cap II
1989 European champion – Master Craftsman
Badminton Horse Trials:
1985 – Priceless, 
1989 – Master Craftsman, 
1993 – Welton Houdini
Burghley Horse Trials:
1983 – Priceless, 
1984 – Night Cap II,
1985 – Priceless, 
1986 – Murphy Himself 
1989 – Master Craftsman (first person to win Burghley five times).

Personal life
Born Virginia Holgate and raised in Malta, she married Hamish Leng in 1985. The couple divorced in 1989. In 1993, she married Michael Elliott. Her Horses Night Cap II and Priceless, were by the eventing stallion Ben Faerie. Since the 1980s, she has written several books.

In 1987, she participated in Prince Edward's charity television special The Grand Knockout Tournament.

References 

1955 births
Living people
British event riders
Olympic equestrians of Great Britain
British female equestrians
Olympic silver medallists for Great Britain
Olympic bronze medallists for Great Britain
Equestrians at the 1984 Summer Olympics
Equestrians at the 1988 Summer Olympics
Equestrians at the 1992 Summer Olympics
Olympic medalists in equestrian
Medalists at the 1988 Summer Olympics
Medalists at the 1984 Summer Olympics
Members of the Order of the British Empire